La Bande à Ovide, a.k.a. Ovide and the Gang, is a 1980s animated TV show produced by the Canadian animation studio CinéGroupe (who also produced Mega Babies, Sharky and George and The Little Flying Bears) in association with Belgium's Odec Kid Cartoons. It ran on Télévision de Radio Canada starting October 17, 1987, to 1989 and also goes by the names "Ovide Video" and "Ovide's Video Show"; the series gained popularity in the United Kingdom when it was broadcast on the Children's BBC service in 1988 and 1989 in a Friday afternoon slot before switching to Channel 4.

The characters were created and designed by Bernard Godi  in cooperation with Belgian comics artist and animator Nic Broca, who had previously designed the Snorks for SEPP. The show premiered in the United Kingdom on January 17, 1990.

Synopsis
The show stars a blue platypus named Ovide who lives on a non-descript South Seas island, where he has adventures with his friends and thwarts Cy and Bobo, the show's villains.

Main characters
Ovide – The main character of the show. A duck-billed platypus, he is the unofficial leader of the group, and is smart, responsible and kind hearted. Ovide is voiced by Thor Bishopric.
Saphron – Saphron is Ovide's cousin, and also a platypus. He is a good cook and gardener. Saphron is voiced by Terrence Scammell.
Polo – A feisty red lizard who always carries around a broom. The island's janitor and the "tough guy" of the group, and he's always trying and failing to catch Woody, a destructive woodworm. Polo is voiced by Terrence Scammell.
Groaner – A white toucan, and one of Ovide's friends. His name comes from the fact that he's always telling weak jokes which make people groan. Groaner is voiced by Dean Hagopian.
Doe, Rae & Mi – Protagonist koalas, always on twigs or the couch. Their names come from the first three solfège syllables, and they visually represent the three wise monkeys: Doe wears headphones hearing music (Hear no Evil), Rae wears sunglasses (See no Evil), and Mi almost always covers his mouth, and sometimes hiccups (Speak no Evil).
Matilda – A female kangaroo. Not originally from the island, she mistook the others for cannibals and hid from them, but then warmed up to them. She is skilled with herbal remedies and with the boomerang. She is first seen in episode 18.
Cy Sly – The primary antagonist of the show. He is a vain, scheming, megalomaniacal python. He is jealous of Ovide and wishes to overthrow him and gain control of the island. Cy is voiced by A.J. Henderson.
Bobo – Cy's bumbling, Keel-billed toucan minion and only friend. Refers to Cy as "Boss". Despite his association with Cy, he has a good heart and wishes Ovide and his friends no ill-will. Bobo is also let off the hook a lot, unlike Cy who always suffers the consequences. Bobo is voiced by Terrence Scammell.
Woody – A mischievous woodworm who tunnels around the island. He is known to alter the state of bowling games and gnaw holes into the base of Ovide's home. He is in constant conflict with Polo.
Alvin – A blue three-toed sloth who lives in the forest of the island. His role in the cartoon is (more often than not) very minor and the only word he can pronounce is "Aye".
Newscaster Lady – A pink-haired platypus whose name has not been revealed. She is the constantly-occurring face on television and the information she provides is beneficial to Ovide (and even Cy at times).

Role of television in Ovide
Television plays an important role in this series. In every episode, Ovide and his friends are watching a programme; Ovide carries a brown briefcase which contains a portable TV set; and there's a wandering TV on the island that approaches the characters at crucial moments and provides information important to the plot. Every time Cy sees the TV, he apparently becomes entranced by it.#

Episodes

A number of these episodes were released on VHS by Celebrity Home Entertainment for the "Just for Kids" series, hosted by Noel C. Bloom Jr. during the late 1980s and (assumingly) early 1990s.

References

External links
Ovide at ClassicKidsTV.co.uk
Ovide and the Gang International

Canadian children's animated comedy television series
Fictional monotremes
Ici Radio-Canada Télé original programming
Television shows filmed in Montreal
1987 Canadian television series debuts
1989 Canadian television series endings
1980s Canadian animated television series